Carn Ingli is a Site of Special Scientific Interest (SSSI) in the Preseli Hills, Pembrokeshire, Wales. It was designated a SSSI in January 1954 in an attempt to protect its fragile biological elements.

Type
This site is designated due to its biological qualities. SSSIs in Wales have been notified for a total of 142 different animal species and 191 different plant species.

It is the oceanic heathland vegetation which makes this area special. Rock outcrops and associated blockfields add to the diversity as does the small areas of spring-fed flushes. The area also includes several scarce plants, including lichens, and a rare damselfly, Coenagrion mercuriale.

See also
List of Sites of Special Scientific Interest in Pembrokeshire
 Mynydd Carningli

References

External links
Natural Resources Wales website

Sites of Special Scientific Interest in Pembrokeshire
Newport, Pembrokeshire